The 1987 Belgian Open was a women's tennis tournament played on outdoor clay courts in Knokke-Le-Zoute, Belgium and was part of the Category 1+ tier of the 1987 Virginia Slims World Championship Series. It was the inaugural edition of the tournament and was held from 6 July until 12 July 1987. Seventh-seeded Kathleen Horvath won the singles final.

Finals

Singles
 Kathleen Horvath defeated  Bettina Bunge 6–1, 7–6(7–5)
 It was Horvath's only singles title of the year and the 6th and last of her career.

Doubles
 Bettina Bunge /  Manuela Maleeva defeated  Kathleen Horvath /  Marcella Mesker 4–6, 6–4, 6–3

References

External links
 ITF tournament edition details
 Tournament draws

Belgian Open
Belgian Open (tennis)
Belgian Open
Belgian Open
1987 in Belgian tennis